Nghlhav Mehtabs Singh (11 November 1948 – 5 January 2021) was an Indian boxer. He competed in the men's light heavyweight event at the 1972 Summer Olympics. He died on 5 January 2021.

References

External links
 

1948 births
2021 deaths
Indian male boxers
Olympic boxers of India
Boxers at the 1972 Summer Olympics
Place of birth missing
Asian Games medalists in boxing
Boxers at the 1974 Asian Games
Asian Games silver medalists for India
Medalists at the 1974 Asian Games
Light-heavyweight boxers
Recipients of the Arjuna Award